Bruce Kidd,  (born July 26, 1943) is a Canadian academic, author, and athlete.

Born in Ottawa, Ontario, he was a member of the University of Toronto track and field team. He won 18 national senior championships in Canada, the United States, and Britain. He won a gold (in the 6 Miles event) and bronze medal (in the 3 Miles event) at the 1962 British Empire and Commonwealth Games and was a member of the Canadian 1964 Summer Olympics team (competing in the Men's 5000 metres, Men's 10000 metres and scheduled to start in the  Men's marathon). His personal bests included a time of 2:20:18 to win the Peach Bowl Marathon in Atlanta, Georgia, on December 28, 1974, and an indoor best for two miles 8:39.0 in Wembley, England, on March 30, 1964. On outdoor tracks, he had times of 8:38.2, two months later in Modesto, California. For five kilometres, he ran 13:43.8, in Compton, California, when he was only eighteen years old, and 29:46.4 for ten kilometres in 1974 in Winnipeg, Manitoba. A short documentary film about him, entitled Runner, was produced and directed by Don Owen and narrated by W. H. Auden.

He received his Bachelor of Arts in Political Economy in 1965 from the University of Toronto and a Master of Arts in Adult Education in 1968 from the University of Chicago. He also received a Master of Arts in history in 1980 and a Ph.D. in history in 1990 from York University. Kidd has an honorary doctor of laws from Dalhousie University. In 1970, he joined the University of Toronto as a lecturer. He was appointed an assistant professor in 1973 and an associate professor in 1979. In 1991, he was appointed a professor. He was formerly director of the School of Physical and Health Education and acting director of the Department of Athletics and Recreation. He is a professor in the Faculty of Kinesiology and Physical Education and the Warden of Hart House at the University of Toronto. On February 27, 2014, Kidd was named to become the interim vice president and principal for University of Toronto Scarborough. Subsequently, in December 2014, he was appointed as the tenth principal of University of Toronto Scarborough.

He is an honorary member of the Canadian Olympic Committee and volunteer chair of the Selection Committee, Canada's Sports Hall of Fame.
In 2018, Bruce was inducted into Scarborough Walk of Fame.

Politics
Kidd ran for the Ontario New Democratic Party in the riding of Beaches—Woodbine in the 1971 Ontario general election. He lost with less than 40% of the vote.

Awards and honours
 1961 and 1962 – the Canadian Press' Athlete of the Year.
 1961 – awarded the Lou Marsh Trophy.
 1966 – inducted into the Canadian Olympic Hall of Fame as an athlete.
 1968 – inducted into Canada's Sports Hall of Fame.
 1988 – inducted into the University of Toronto Sports Hall of Fame.
 1994 – inducted into the Canadian Olympic Hall of Fame as a builder. (Kidd is the only person to have been twice elected to this hall of fame).
 2004 – made an Officer of the Order of Canada for having "devoted his life to eradicating sexism and racism in sporting communities around the world".

Selected bibliography
 The Death of Hockey (with John Mcfarlane, 1972)
 The Political Economy of Sport (1979)
 Tom Longboat (1980)
 Hockey Showdown (1980)
 Who's a Soccer Player (1980)
 Athletes' Rights in Canada (with Mary Eberts, 1982)
 The Struggle for Canadian Sport (1996), winner of the North American Society of Sport History book prize.
 "Sports and Masculinity (2013)

References

External links
 
 

1943 births
Living people
Canadian male long-distance runners
Canadian university and college faculty deans
Commonwealth Games gold medallists for Canada
Commonwealth Games bronze medallists for Canada
Lou Marsh Trophy winners
Officers of the Order of Canada
Olympic track and field athletes of Canada
Athletes (track and field) at the 1962 British Empire and Commonwealth Games
Athletes (track and field) at the 1964 Summer Olympics
Athletes from Ottawa
University of Chicago alumni
University of Toronto alumni
Writers from Ottawa
Canadian sportswriters
Sports historians
York University alumni
Academic staff of the University of Toronto
Commonwealth Games medallists in athletics
Ontario New Democratic Party candidates in Ontario provincial elections
Canadian sportsperson-politicians
Medallists at the 1962 British Empire and Commonwealth Games